The Stars in Their Eyes European Championships 2002 was the second and last special European Soundmix Show.

Like the show from 2001, this one was held in Manchester. The competition was divided on two shows. It was produced by Granada Television and ITV. The show was mainly made for the British audience, and was not aired on television in all the competing countries. The debutant Ireland won the competition with Rebecca O'Connor imitating Tina Turner.

European Soundmix Show
Singing talent shows
2002 in music
2002 in British music